The Aranos Reformed Church was a congregation of the Reformed Churches in South Africa (GKSA) in Aranos in eastern Namibia. It left the denomination in 2016. With 16 confirmed and five baptized members at the end of 2014, it was the second smallest Reformed Church in Namibia, after the Karasburg Reformed Church, which had 12 confirmed and two baptized members. In 2015, the Aranos congregation grew to 19 confirmed and six baptized members.

Background 
From late in the 19th century, when the Mariental Dutch Reformed Church (NGK) (then Gibeon) was founded, until 1930, the church council only recognized five congregations in South West Africa, in which the Dutch Reformed Church in South Africa (NGK) was the only one of the three Afrikaner churches that was active. In 1930, three churches of the GKSA were formed in quick succession, namely in Gobabis, Outjo, and Aranos, after 1,922 Afrikaners left over from the Dorsland Trek were repatriated from Angola in 1929. The Dorsland Trekkers were mainly affiliated with the GKSA, though there were some members of the Dutch Reformed Church in South Africa (NHK), who founded the first NHK denominations in Namibia in 1937, namely Gobabis (July 31), Otjiwarongo (August 21), and Grootfontein (September 4). Due to this migration, the NHK church in Gobabis is older than the NGK church there. The GKSA church in Aranos, however, is 22 years older than its NGK counterpart.

Foundation 
Near South West Africa, there were GKSA congregations in Humpata and Que, which were disbanded in 1928 over the aforementioned exodus of Angolan Afrikaners. Those members of the Aranos church who did not come from Angola came northward from the Union of South Africa. The first services were held June 20, 1930, in Kemel farm. On June 21, a service was held at Kema farm, beginning the Gibeon Reformed Church. Services were held on the Omrah farm until June 20, 1959, when the church building finally opened along with the first Classis in South West Africa. From 1940 to 1959, the congregation was also known as the Omrah Reformed Church.

Building of the town church 
Dm. H.A. Louw served 76 confirmed and 85 baptized members in Aranos in 1958 (at the time, only three pastors served the 13 GKSA Reformed Churches), prompting the building committee to consider building a church there. The town, around 175 km from Mariental, had at first been known as Arahoab, but due to confusion with Aroab, the name was changed to Aranos, a portmanteau of Arahoab and the Nossob River, on the banks of which Aranos lies. In 1954, Aranos was granted town status, and in 1957, a town board was founded. The town grew quickly at first. During the tenure of Dr. D.C.S. van der Merwe (pastor in Windhoek from 1950 to 1957, who was also responsible for Aranos), the church council obtained a parcel of land from the town. An architect from Windhoek was tasked with the blueprint.

The church council issued bonds for the church building, but they were insufficient, so they took ownership. Fortunately, money from sales and donations was plentiful. Most members, especially the younger ones, worked avidly on the project since they wanted a church based where their children were in boarding school.

On February 11, 1959, exactly a century after Dm. Dirk Postma founded the GKSA under a lilac tree in Rustenburg in the faraway Transvaal Republic, Dm. H.A. Louw laid the keystone of the Aranos Reformed Church. The members worked hard to build the church under council guidance, especially a builder named Kiepie Erasmus. The builders deviated from the architect's plan, however, for instance completing the concrete tower with cement bricks.

Not long after the completion of the church building, the council built a rectory. Dm. Louw's successor, Dm. M.A. Kruger, was the first pastor to live there.

Overview 
Over the years, the Aranos congregation coped with financial problems and never grew significantly. At the end of 1958, for example, there were 76 confirmed members, and at the end of 1997, there were 84. However, in the next four years the congregation cut in half to 36 of them and to half again at 16 by the end of 2014. The members' efforts continued, however, in 2016 outside of GKSA auspices. Even before the Middellande Synod (primarily consisting of black churches) and its primarily white or mixed-race counterparts were reclassified into the Klassis format, denominations seceded from Aranos, including Namib-Kus in 2007 and Khomas-Hoogland in 2009. The three congregations were all members until 2016 of the Klassis Waterberg, along with Outjo, Otjiwarongo, and Biermanskool, while the other 12 Namibian churches belonged to Klassis Etosha. Aranos, Outjo, Biermanskool, Namib-Kus, and Khomas-Hoogland all seceded from the GKSA in 2016, by which time Otjiwarongo had already joined the Klassis Etosha.

Pastors 
 Kruger, dr. Mechiel Andries, 1963–1968 (together with the Ghanzi Reformed Church)
 Welding, Jozua Francois, 1969–1974 (together with Ghanzi), 1974–1977 (alone after Ghanzi disbanded)
 De Klerk, dr. Theunis Christiaan, 1978–1982
 Combrink, dr. Vorster, 1982–1987
 Le Roux, Abraham Hercules, 1982–1991 (missionary)
 Roets, Cornelius Johannes Christiaan, 1987–1996
 Snyman, Willem Marthinus, 1996–1998 (together with the Mariental Reformed Church), 1998–2006 (just Aranos), 2006–2011 (together with Namib-Kus Reformed Church; left the ministry)
 Le Roux, Jacobus Petrus, 2013 – present (together with the Khomas-Hoogland Reformed Church and Namib-Kus)

Sources 
 (af) Harris, C.T., Noëth, J.G., Sarkady, N.G., Schutte, F.M. en Van Tonder, J.M. 2010. Van seringboom tot kerkgebou: die argitektoniese erfenis van die Gereformeerde Kerke. Potchefstroom: Administratiewe Buro.
 (en) Potgieter, D.J. (chief ed.) Standard Encyclopaedia of Southern Africa. Cape Town: Nasionale Opvoedkundige Uitgewery Ltd., 1973.
 (en) Raper, P.E. 1987. Dictionary of South African Place Names. Johannesburg: Lowry Publishers.
 (af) Schalekamp, Dm. M.E. (chairman: edition commission). 2001. Die Almanak van die Gereformeerde Kerke in Suid-Afrika vir die jaar 2002. Potchefstroom: Administratiewe Buro.
 (af) Van der Walt, Dr. S.J. (chairman: almanac deputies). 1997. Die Almanak van die Gereformeerde Kerke in Suid-Afrika vir die jaar 1998. Potchefstroom: Administratiewe Buro.
 (af) Venter, Dm. A.A. (chief ed.) 1957. Almanak van die Gereformeerde Kerk in Suid-Afrika vir die jaar 1958. Potchefstroom: Administratiewe Buro.
 (af) Venter, Dm. A.A. (chief ed.) 1958. Almanak van die Gereformeerde Kerk in Suid-Afrika vir die jaar 1959. Potchefstroom: Administratiewe Buro.
 (af) Vogel, Willem (ed.). 2014. Die Almanak van die Gereformeerde Kerke in Suid-Afrika vir die jaar 2015. Potchefstroom: Administratiewe Buro.

Afrikaner culture in Namibia
Hardap Region
Churches in Namibia
1930 establishments in South West Africa
Christian organizations established in 1930
Protestantism in Namibia
Reformed Churches in South Africa